Ema datshi is among the most famous dishes in Bhutanese cuisine, recognized as a national dish of Bhutan. It is made from hot chili peppers and cheese; "ema" means "chili" and "datshi" means "cheese" in the Dzongkha language of Bhutan.

Different varieties of chilies may be used: green chili, red chili, or white chili (green chili washed in hot water and sun-dried), which may be dried or fresh. The chilies are called "sha ema" which is a Capsicum annuum cultivar, a form of pepper much like cayenne, poblano, ancho, or Anaheim.

The cheese used in ema datshi is called Datshi, it is homemade from the curd of cow or yak's milk. In the process, the fat is removed from the curd to make butter, and the remaining curd without fat is used to make the cheese. After the cheese is made, the whey is left over, which is used as a soup that can be taken with rice. No part of the milk is wasted.

Kewa datshi
A related dish is called kewa datshi which substitutes the chilis with potatoes.

Likewise, any kind of datshi can be made using any vegetable or meat products. If bean is substituted for chili, it is called bean (semchum) datshi. If mushrooms are substituted, it is called mushroom (shamu) datshi. Beef datshi is another well-known variation.

References

Further reading

Bhutanese cuisine
Cheese dishes
Chili pepper dishes
National dishes
Vegetable dishes
Vegetarian cuisine
Spicy foods